Terry Jerome LeCount (born July 9, 1956) is an American former college and professional football player who was a wide receiver in the National Football League (NFL) for nine seasons during the 1970s and 1980s.  LeCount played college football for the University of Florida, and thereafter, he played professionally for the San Francisco 49ers and Minnesota Vikings of the NFL.

Early years 

LeCount was born in Jacksonville, Florida in 1956.  He attended William M. Raines High School in Jacksonville, and he led the Raines Vikings high school football team to the Florida Class 4A state championship game as their quarterback in 1973.  LeCount was a multi-sport athlete and flourished in track and field where he was champion of the 220 and 440-yard dashes.

College career 

LeCount accepted an athletic scholarship to attend the University of Florida in Gainesville, Florida, where he played for coach Doug Dickey's Florida Gators football team from 1974 to 1977.  He was the second African-American, following Donald Gaffney, who played the quarterback position for the Gators, and led Dickey's "gatorbone" offense, a variation of the wishbone offense.

Professional career 

He finished his eight-season NFL career having played in seventy-two games, started nineteen of them, with eighty-nine receptions for 1,354 yards and seven touchdowns.

Life after football 

LeCount worked at ArchRival Sports at Strawberry Village in Mill Valley from 1988 to 2002. He was an assistant manager while coaching Track and Field at Tamalpais High School in Mill Valley, California.

LeCount married his former college sweetheart Valjean in 2002, and they live in Atlanta, Georgia.  As of 2015, he works as a fan ambassador at the College Football Hall of Fame in downtown Atlanta.  He formerly worked as a paraprofessional in the Decatur public schools.

See also 

 Florida Gators football, 1970–79
 History of the Minnesota Vikings
 History of the San Francisco 49ers
 List of Florida Gators in the NFL Draft

References

Bibliography 

 Carlson, Norm, University of Florida Football Vault: The History of the Florida Gators, Whitman Publishing, LLC, Atlanta, Georgia (2007).  .
 Golenbock, Peter, Go Gators!  An Oral History of Florida's Pursuit of Gridiron Glory, Legends Publishing, LLC, St. Petersburg, Florida (2002).  .
 Hairston, Jack, Tales from the Gator Swamp: A Collection of the Greatest Gator Stories Ever Told, Sports Publishing, LLC, Champaign, Illinois (2002).  .
 McCarthy, Kevin M.,  Fightin' Gators: A History of University of Florida Football, Arcadia Publishing, Mount Pleasant, South Carolina (2000).  .
 Nash, Noel, ed., The Gainesville Sun Presents The Greatest Moments in Florida Gators Football, Sports Publishing, Inc., Champaign, Illinois (1998).  .

1956 births
Living people
American football wide receivers
American football quarterbacks
Florida Gators football players
Minnesota Vikings players
Players of American football from Jacksonville, Florida
San Francisco 49ers players
William M. Raines High School alumni